Beth Ann Labson Freeman (born November 21, 1953) is a United States district judge of the United States District Court for the Northern District of California.

Biography

Freeman was born Beth Ann Labson in 1953, in Washington, D.C. She received a Bachelor of Arts degree in 1976 from the University of California at Berkeley. She received a Juris Doctor in 1979 from Harvard Law School. From 1979 to 1981, she worked at Fried, Frank, Harris, Shriver and Jacobson and from 1981 to 1983, she worked at Lasky, Haas, Cohler and Munter. From 1983 to 2001, she served as Deputy County Counsel at the San Mateo County Counsel's Office. From 1987 to the present, she has been affiliated with Peninsula Temple Beth El, a Reform Judaism synagogue where, prior to 2012, she served the community in various official capacities. From 2001 to 2014, she served as a Judge on the San Mateo County Superior Court, serving as Assistant Presiding Judge from 2009 to 2010 and Presiding Judge from 2011 to 2012. As a county judge, she presided over a broad array of civil and criminal matters.

Federal judicial service

On June 20, 2013, President Barack Obama nominated Freeman to serve as a United States District Judge of the United States District Court for the Northern District of California, to a new seat created on October 3, 2011, pursuant to 28 U.S.C. 133(b)(1). On October 31, 2013, the Senate Judiciary Committee reported Freeman's nomination to the full Senate.  After the first session of the 113th Congress ended, Freeman's nomination was returned to President Obama, who renominated Freeman in January 2014.  The Senate Judiciary Committee reported Freeman's nomination to the full Senate on January 16, 2014. On February 12, 2014, Senate Majority Leader Harry Reid filed for cloture on Freeman's nomination. On Tuesday February 25, 2014 the Senate invoked cloture on Freeman's nomination by a 56–42 vote, with one Senator voted present. Freeman’s nomination was confirmed later that day by a 91–7 vote. Freeman received her judicial commission on February 26, 2014.

Notable cases

On December 22, 2020, Judge Freeman handed down a nationwide injunction blocking enforcement of President Donald Trump's executive order barring federal contractors from training employees on various concepts rooted in critical race theory, finding the measure cuts into the constitutional freedoms of LGBTQ advocacy groups who filed a legal challenge. In her ruling, Judge Freeman wrote that the administration's directive to federal agencies to cancel training contracts involving “critical race theory,” “white privilege,” “intersectionality,” “systemic racism,” “positionality,” “racial humility,” and “unconscious bias” was likely unconstitutional.

See also
 List of Jewish American jurists

References

External links

1953 births
Living people
American women lawyers
American lawyers
California lawyers
California state court judges
Harvard Law School alumni
Jewish American government officials
Judges of the United States District Court for the Northern District of California
Law in the San Francisco Bay Area
People from Washington, D.C.
United States district court judges appointed by Barack Obama
University of California, Berkeley alumni
21st-century American judges
People associated with Fried, Frank, Harris, Shriver & Jacobson
21st-century American women judges